Slate Quarry Road Dutch Barn is a historic dutch barn located at Rhinebeck, Dutchess County, New York.

It was built about 1790 and is a large, nearly square "H" frame building.  It is sheathed in horizontal weatherboarding and has a gable roof.  It has one main story with a spacious hayloft.

It was added to the National Register of Historic Places in 1987.

References

Barns on the National Register of Historic Places in New York (state)
Infrastructure completed in 1790
Buildings and structures in Dutchess County, New York
1790 establishments in New York (state)
National Register of Historic Places in Dutchess County, New York